Shang-keng Ma (September 24, 1940, Chongqing, Sichuan, China – November 24, 1983, La Jolla, California) was a Chinese theoretical physicist, known for his work on the theory of critical phenomena and random systems. He is known as the co-author with Bertrand Halperin and Pierre Hohenberg of a 1972 paper that "generalized the renormalization group theory to dynamical critical phenomena." Ma is also known as the co-author with Yoseph Imry of a 1975 paper and with Amnon Aharony and Imry of a 1976 paper that established the foundation of the random field Ising model (RFIM)

Biography
He transferred in 1959 from the National Taiwan University to the University of California, Berkeley. There he graduated in 1962 with a bachelor's degree in science and in 1966 with a Ph.D. His Ph.D. thesis Correlations of Photons from a Thermal Source was supervised by Kenneth M. Watson. As a postdoc in 1966, Ma went to the University of California, San Diego (UCSD) to study with Keith Brueckner. Ma's outstanding ability earned him a faculty appointment at UCSD in less than a year. He was at the Institute for Advanced Study (IAS) from September 1968 to June 1969 and 
in the autumn of 1970. There he worked with Shau-Jin Chang on the infinite-energy limit of Feynman diagrams and with Roger Dashen on the S-matrix formulation of statistical mechanics. In 1971 he became a tenured faculty member of the UCSD physics department and became a Sloan Research Fellow.

In 1976 Ma was a visiting scientist at Paris-Saclay University and published his paper Renormalization group by Monte Carlo methods, which introduced a technique which "has evolved into a powerful technology that is widely used today for the numerical study of critical phenomena."

In the two academic years 1977–1978 and 1981–1982 he taught in Taiwan at Tsinghua University, where he wrote in Chinese an advanced text on statistical mechanics — the book, published in 1983, "eschews the traditional approach built on the Gibbs ensemble." World Scientific published an English translation in 1985. In 1986 World Scientific also published a memorial volume in honor of Ma.

Upon his death he was survived by his widow and two children.

Articles
 
 
 
  (over 600 citations)
 
 
 
 
 
 
 
  (over 1100 citations)
 
  (over 1000 citations)
  (over 600 citations)
  (over 3100 citations)
 
 
 
 
  (over 450 citations)

Books
 
  1982
 
  1985

References

1940 births
1983 deaths
20th-century Chinese physicists
Sloan Research Fellows
University of California, Berkeley alumni
University of California, San Diego faculty